Maureen Jane Beattie  (born 14 August 1953) is an Irish-born, Scottish actress of both stage and screen.

Early life
Beattie was born in Bundoran, County Donegal on 14 August 1953, as the daughter of Scottish actor and comedian Johnny Beattie, who appeared as Malcolm Hamilton in Glasgow drama River City, and his wife Kitty Lamont. She is the eldest of four children, and is the sister of Louise Beattie who appeared in Emmerdale in 2000 as Chris Tate's lawyer Laura Johnstone.

Beattie  was born in the seaside resort of Bundoran, Co Donegal, whilst her father was appearing at the town's St Patrick's Hall. She returned home to Glasgow, when she was two weeks old. After attending High School in Glasgow, she went on to do a three-year course at  the Royal Scottish Academy of Music and Dramatic Art  where she won the James Bridie Gold Medal for Acting during her final year. She graduated in 1974 with a Diploma in Dramatic Arts.

Career
After graduating, Beattie went on to play many roles in the theatre with companies across the UK including the National Theatre of Scotland, National Theatre in London, the Globe, the RSC and the Royal Exchange in Manchester    as well as touring internationally. Previous theatre credits include: The List, The Carousel, The Deliverance (Stellar Quines); John Gabriel Barclay (Óran Mór); Yer Granny, 27 and The Enquirer (National Theatre of Scotland); Romeo & Juliet (Rose Theatre Kingston); Dark Road, The Cherry Orchard (Royal Lyceum Theatre Edinburgh); Noises Off (The Old Vic); No Quarter (Royal Court Theatre); Ghosts (Citizens Theatre); Masterbuilder, Othello, The Merry Wives of Windsor (National Theatre); The History Plays, Richard III, Titus Andronicus, The Lion, The Witch and The Wardrobe RSC.

She has also worked extensively in television where her roles include Casualty, Bramwell, The Bill, Ruffian Hearts, The Long Roads, Wing and a Prayer and All Night Long. Her most notable role in TV is that of Sandra Nicholl in medical drama Casualty from November 1991 until February 1993.

In 2005 she played Mrs Danvers in a national tour of Rebecca, with Nigel Havers.

in 2006 she was a member of the Royal Shakespeare Company's "Histories Ensemble", where her roles included Eleanor, Duchess of Gloucester in Henry VI Part II, and the Duchess of York in Richard III.

In September 2006 she was interviewed by Sally Magnusson about life with her father for the Radio Scotland series Dad Made Me Laugh, later networked throughout the UK on BBC Radio 4 Extra.

In 2007, Beattie appeared in the feature film Finding Bob McArthur as Russian actress, Svetlana. The film, also starring John Stahl, Bob Edwards and Alan Bell, was directed by Jim Hickey and produced by Robin Mitchell.

In 2008, she read part of the book Corvus: A Life with Birds for BBC Radio 4.

In 2011, she played Iseabail Nic Aodh, the mother of the main character Katie Nic Aodh, in The Decoy Bride.

In 2013, she played the lead role of Isobel McArthur in Ian Rankin's debut play Dark Road.

In 2014, she played Professor Fiona Bellows in the Doctor Who Christmas Special "Last Christmas"

In 2017, Beattie joined the Young Vic cast of Federico García Lorca's Yerma.

In 2020, Beattie played Carol Kendrick in Deadwater Fell, a four-episode British television crime series. 

In February 2022, it was confirmed that she will be playing Mrs. Pearce in My Fair Lady at the  London Coliseum, St. Martin's Lane from May to August 2022.

She was appointed Officer of the Order of the British Empire in the 2020 New Year Honours for services to the entertainment industry.

Personal life
Beattie is active in the actors' trade union Equity, leading their investigations into sexual harassment in the industry. In 2018, she was elected President of Equity, as only the second female president in the organisation's history.

Theatre credits

Filmography

Film

Television

Radio

References

1953 births
Living people
Scottish stage actresses
Scottish soap opera actresses
Scottish radio actresses
Alumni of the Royal Conservatoire of Scotland
Officers of the Order of the British Empire
Presidents of British trade unions